The 1925 Canadian federal election was held on October 29, 1925 to elect members  of the House of Commons of Canada of the 15th Parliament of Canada. The Conservative party took the most seats in the House of Commons, although not a majority. Prime Minister William Lyon Mackenzie King's Liberal Party was invited to form a minority government. Unlike the Conservative party, King's Liberals had the conditional support of the many Farmer/Progressive MPs.

The government fell the following year. Governor General Baron Byng of Vimy offered the Conservatives under Meighen a chance to form government. This too fell in short order. Byng's action precipitated the "King–Byng Affair", which became the main issue of the 1926 election.

Background
The previous federal election in 1921 had seen Mackenzie King's Liberals fall narrowly short of winning a parliamentary majority, with Arthur Meighen's Conservatives falling to being the third-largest party, and the new Progressive Party, which had nominated candidates for the first time that year, held the balance of power. King was able to rule with the tacit support of the Progressives, and was not facing a statutory federal election until December 1926; however, a budget proposed in September 1925 by finance minister William Stevens Fielding was unexpectedly voted down in parliament, obligating Mackenzie King to resign as Prime Minister and recommend to the Governor General, Baron Byng of Vimy to hold a new election (theoretically King could have recommended that Byng allow either Meighen or Progressive leader Robert Forke to form a government, but the Conservatives were far short of the number of MPs required to form a stable government, and Forke had no interest in being Prime Minister).

Aftermath and the King-Byng Affair
The Liberals won fewer seats than the Conservatives, who were left eight seats short of a majority. The Progressives lost almost two thirds of their seats from the previous election, but they still held enough seats to control the balance of power. King decided to hold on to power with the help of the Progressives. The Progressives were closely aligned with the Liberals and enabled King to form a minority government.

That plan was complicated by the fact that his party won fewer seats than the Conservatives and that King himself had lost his seat in the House of Commons. Meighen was outraged by King's move and demanded for King to resign from the Prime Minister's office. Byng privately agreed that the Conservatives should be allowed to form the next government and felt that the Liberal-Progressive pact was a corrupt bargain, but he found that there were no valid legal grounds for refusing to allow King to continue in office. King asked a Liberal Member of Parliament from Prince Albert, Saskatchewan, to resign so that he could run in the resulting by-election. Prince Albert was one of the safest seats in Canada for the Liberals, and King won easily.

With King back in Parliament, a huge scandal rocked the King cabinet when one of his appointees was discovered to be accepting bribes from a male lover. Anticipating a vote of censure by the Commons, King asked Byng to call an election. The Governor General refused, and King resigned on June 28, 1926. Meighen was then invited to form a government.

King claimed that was interference in Canadian politics by an official appointed by a foreign power.  King showed rare fire and rallied the Progressives back into his camp. He defeated Meighen on a vote of confidence after only three days, which made the Meighen government of 1926 the shortest-lasting government in Canadian history. This time, Byng called an election.

National results 

Notes:

* not applicable - the party was not recognized in the previous election

Vote and seat summaries

Results by province

See also
 
List of Canadian federal general elections
List of political parties in Canada
15th Canadian Parliament

References

External links
Principles vs Puffiness, by J.L. Granatstein

 Federal
1925
October 1925 events